Kaitlin "Katie" Austra Stelmanis (born 1985) is a Toronto-based Latvian Canadian musician, who has performed and recorded both as a solo artist and with the bands Galaxy and Austra. Stelmanis identifies herself as a lesbian.

Career

Solo career 
She is classically trained and began performing in the Canadian Children’s Opera Chorus at age 10. She was subsequently a member of the band Galaxy, along with Maya Postepski and Emma McKenna.

Her debut album, Join Us, was released by Blocks Recording Club, a Toronto-based artistic collective that has supported numerous artists through the years including Owen Pallett, Fucked Up and Bob Wiseman. Her debut single as a solo artist, "Believe Me", was released by Loog Records and Vice Records on 22 June 2009.

In 2008, Stelmanis appeared on Fucked Up's album The Chemistry of Common Life. She also contributed tracks to the compilation albums Friends in Bellwoods and Friends in Bellwoods II.

In 2011, she co-wrote and sang on the Death in Vegas songs "Come Ride With Me", "Your Loft My Acid" and "Witchdance" from the album Trans-Love Energies.

In 2016 Stelmanis delved deeper into writing lyrics and wrote her band Austra's album Future Politics primarily alone.

Influences 
Katie Stelmanis told Interview Magazine that she "was obsessed with classical music" while growing up. She cites artists such as Kate Bush, Nine Inch Nails, and Massive Attack as influences. Additionally, she takes inspiration from opera, Chicago house, and Detroit techno.

Discography 
Galaxy
 2006: I Want You to Notice (Self Released)

Katie Stelmanis
 2008: Join Us (Blocks Recording Club)

7 inch
 2008: Fucked Up / Katie Stelmanis - Royal Swan Matador Records
 2009: Believe Me (Loog, Vice Records)

Compilations
 2007: Friends in Bellwoods (You'll Fall)
 2009: Friends in Bellwoods II (Believe Me)

Personal life
Stelmanis is of Italian, English and Latvian descent. Her father is Italian and her mother is half-Latvian and half-English.

References

External links
 

1985 births
Canadian indie rock musicians
Canadian people of Latvian descent
Canadian people of Italian descent
Canadian people of English descent
Canadian women singer-songwriters
Feminist musicians
Canadian lesbian musicians
Canadian LGBT singers
Canadian LGBT songwriters
Living people
Musicians from Toronto
Lesbian singers
Lesbian songwriters
Stelmanis, Katie
21st-century Canadian women singers
20th-century Canadian LGBT people
21st-century Canadian LGBT people
Canadian women in electronic music